Saint-Eustache-la-Forêt is a commune in the Seine-Maritime department in the Normandy region in northern France.

Geography

Population

Places of interest
 The sixteenth-century houses.
 The church dating from the thirteenth century.
 The seventeenth-century château du Val-d'Arques.

See also
Communes of the Seine-Maritime department

References

Communes of Seine-Maritime